Hilltopper or hilltoppers may refer to:

Colleges
 Georgetown University, before 1928
 Ohio University – Chillicothe
 St. Edward's Hilltoppers
 West Liberty University, West Virginia
 Western Kentucky Hilltoppers
 Western Michigan Hilltoppers

Public high schools
 Chardon High School, Chardon, Ohio
 B.M.C. Durfee High School, Fall River, Massachusetts
 E. C. Glass High School, Lynchburg, Virginia
 Glenbard West High School, Glen Ellyn, Illinois
 Glenwood City High School, Glenwood City, Wisconsin
 Hillsboro High School (Illinois), Hillsboro, Illinois
 Hillwood High School, Nashville, Tennessee
 Houston High School (Mississippi), Houston, Mississippi
 Los Alamos High School, Los Alamos, New Mexico

 Marquette University High School, Milwaukee, Wisconsin
 Onalaska High School (Wisconsin), Onalaska, Wisconsin
 Science Hill High School, Johnson City, Tennessee
 Summit High School (New Jersey), Summit, New Jersey
 Westmont Hilltop High School, Johnstown, Pennsylvania

Private high schools
 Hopkins School, New Haven, Connecticut
 Joliet Catholic Academy, Joliet, Illinois
 Marshall School, Duluth, Minnesota
 The Mary Louis Academy, Jamaica Estates, New York
 Schlarman Academy, Danville, Illinois
 St. Johnsbury Academy, Saint Johnsbury, Vermont
 Worcester Academy, Worcester, Massachusetts

Other
 The Hilltoppers (band), an American popular music singing group of the 1950s
 The Hilltoppers, a 1940s big band orchestra led by Tiny Hill
 Hilltopper (train), a passenger train formerly operated by Amtrak